A Treatise of Pleas of the Crown; or, a system of the principal matters relating to that subject, digested under proper heads is an influential treatise on the criminal law of England, written by William Hawkins, serjeant-at-law, and later edited by John Curwood, barrister.  It was first published in 1716 and went through eight editions, the last of which was published in 1824.

It is often cited as "Hawk.P.C." or some similar variation on this.

See also
Books of authority

References

External links
 Eighth edition of this book (1824) from Google Books:
 Volume 1 (Of criminal offences) 
 Volume 2 (Of courts of criminal jurisdiction and the modes of proceeding therein) 

1716 books
1716 in law
English criminal law
Legal treatises